A roofer, roof mechanic, or roofing contractor is a tradesperson who specializes in roof construction. Roofers replace, repair, and install the roofs of buildings, using a variety of materials, including shingles, bitumen, and metal. Roofing work can be physically demanding because it involves heavy lifting, as well as climbing, bending, and kneeling, often in extreme weather conditions. Curled or rotten shingles, missing shingles, and blistering are all signs that roof needs attention.

Global usage 
In Australia, this type of carpenter is called a roof carpenter and the term roofer refers to someone who installs the roof cladding (tiles, tin, etc.).

In the United States and Canada, they're often referred to as roofing contractors or roofing professionals. The most common roofing material in the United States is asphalt shingles. In the past, 3-tab shingles were used; nowadays, "architectural" or "dimensional" shingles are becoming very popular.

Depending on the region, other commonly applied roofing materials installed by roofers include concrete tiles, clay tiles, natural or synthetic slate, single-ply (primarily EPDM rubber, PVC, or TPO), rubber shingles (made from recycled tires), glass, metal panels or shingles, wood shakes or shingles, liquid-applied, hot asphalt/rubber, foam, thatch, and solar tiles. "Living roof" systems, or rooftop landscapes, have become increasingly common in recent years in both residential and commercial applications.

In the United States, regulation of the roofing trade is left up to individual states. Some states leave roofing regulation up to city-level, county-level, and municipal-level jurisdictions. Unlicensed contracting of projects worth over a set threshold may result in stiff fines or even time in prison. In Oklahoma roofers are required to meet insurance and roofing license guidelines. Roofers are also required to show their license number on their marketing material.

The United Kingdom has no legislation in place that requires a roofer to have a license to trade, although some do belong to recognized trade organizations.

Danger 

Roofing is one of the most dangerous professions. Nearly every first-world country has established specific safety regulations for work on the roof, ranging from the use of safety nets, rope and harness systems, Anchor points, and a variety of additional measures. In the United States, the death rate in 2018 was 51.5 per 100,000 for roofers, compared to 3.5 per 100,000 national average. According to the United States Bureau of Labor Statistics, roofing has been within the top 5 highest death rates of any profession for over 10 years in a row.

See also 
Domestic roof construction
Roof cleaning
Flat roof
Membrane roofing
List of commercially available roofing materials

References 

Construction trades workers